Mongolian Ping Pong is a 2005 Mongolian language Chinese film written and directed by Chinese director Ning Hao.

The story is a gentle art film about a Mongolian boy who discovers a ping pong ball and his journey of discovery about its origins.

External links
 
 
 Mongolian Ping Pong Press-kit from First Run Features

2005 comedy films
2000s road movies
2005 films
Mongolian-language films
Films directed by Ning Hao
Chinese comedy films